Albert Nightingale (10 November 1923 – 27 February 2006) was a professional footballer who played as a striker for Sheffield United, Huddersfield Town, Blackburn Rovers and Leeds United.

He died in 2006, aged 82.

References
Albert Nightingale's Obituary at The Huddersfield Daily Examiner

English footballers
Association football forwards
English Football League players
Sheffield United F.C. players
Huddersfield Town A.F.C. players
Blackburn Rovers F.C. players
Leeds United F.C. players
Footballers from Rotherham
1923 births
2006 deaths